Andrew Yorke (born December 20, 1988) is a Canadian professional triathlete. He competed at World Series and World cup levels. He finished 4th at the 2014 Commonwealth Games and 7th at the 2015 Pan American Games.

In 2016, he was named to the Canadian Olympic team.  He finished 42nd in the triathlon with a time of 1:52:46.

References

External links
 ITU Bio
 Official Website

1988 births
Living people
Canadian male triathletes
People from Caledon, Ontario
Sportspeople from Ontario
Triathletes at the 2014 Commonwealth Games
Triathletes at the 2015 Pan American Games
Triathletes at the 2016 Summer Olympics
Olympic triathletes of Canada
Commonwealth Games competitors for Canada
Pan American Games competitors for Canada
21st-century Canadian people